Bembix rostrata is a species of sand wasp native to Central Europe. The genus Bembix - of which B. rostrata is among the most distinctive species - has over 340 species worldwide and is found mostly in warm regions with open, sandy soils; Australia and Africa have a particularly rich variety of species.

Distribution 
Bembix rostrata ranges in distribution from Europe and the Mediterranean to Central Asia, and as far north as Denmark and Sweden.

Characteristics 
Bembix rostrata displays distinctive behaviour in front of its nest, digging its burrows with fast, synchronised movements of its forelegs. In addition, the insect can turn very rapidly about its own axis, the flapping of its wings as it does this producing a buzzing sound reminiscent of a gyroscope. Its size, striking yellow and black-striped abdomen and the labrum, extended into a narrow beak, are distinctive features.

Life History 
Bembix rostrata goes through 4 general life stages: egg, larva, pupa, and adult. Adult females burrow nests into the sand and lay their eggs there. Once the eggs hatch, the new larvae continue their development in the nests that they were born in. Each individual grub develops in its own burrow, this reduces competition for development space and necessary nutrients. Adult B. rostrata gather prey and bring the food back for the developing grubs to feed on. The B. rostrata goes through 4 general life stages: egg, larva, pupa, and adult. When young reach pupal stage, females dig another nest to lay more eggs.

Behaviour 
This is stocked with dozens of insects, predominantly large flies (Tabanidae, Syrphidae), which provide the larva with food for its two-week development to the imago stage. The female carefully re-seals the nest tube after each feeding. Because of this intensive maternal care, a female can raise at most only eight larvae during the high summer. B. rostata is very faithful to its nest sites, often nesting in the same places year-on-year, even if these change over time and alternative habitats are available.

The species has become rare due to loss of large open-sand surfaces in warm areas, such as in the sand dunes of the upper Rhine Graben. It is also the host for several parasitoids in families such as Bombyliidae, Conopidae, and Mutillidae. A cuckoo wasp which specialises in B. rostrata is Parnopes grandior.

The behaviour of B. rostrata led the famous naturalist Jean-Henri Fabre to conduct intensive studies of the species.

References 

Larsson, F. K. (1986). Increased nest density of the digger wasp Bembix rostrata as a response to parasites and predators (Hymenoptera: Sphecidae), Entomol. Gener. 12:71-75.
Larsson, F. K. (1990). Female body size relationships with fecundity and egg size in two solitary species of fossorial Hymenoptera (Colletidae and Sphecidae). Entomol. Gener. 15:167-171.
Larsson, F. K. (1991). Some take it cool, some like it hot — A comparative study of male mate searching tactics in two species of hymenoptera (Colletidae and Sphecidae). J. Therm. Biol. 16:45-51.
Larsson, F. K. & Tengö J. (1989). It is not always good to be large; some female fitness components in a temperate digger wasp, Bembix rostrata (Hymenoptera: Sphecidae) J Kansas Entomol Soc. 62:490–495.
“Sand Wasp - What’s That Bug?” Accessed December 1, 2020. https://www.whatsthatbug.com/2009/07/06/sand-wasp-5/.
“Bembix Rostrata (Linnaeus, 1758) | BWARS.” Accessed December 6, 2020. https://www.bwars.com/wasp/crabronidae/nyssoninae/bembix-rostrata.

External links

Crabronidae
Hymenoptera of Europe
Wasps described in 1758
Taxa named by Carl Linnaeus